The iPhone 12 Pro and iPhone 12 Pro Max are smartphones designed, developed, and marketed by Apple Inc. They are the flagship smartphones in the fourteenth generation of the iPhone, succeeding the iPhone 11 Pro and iPhone 11 Pro Max, respectively. They were unveiled alongside the iPhone 12 and iPhone 12 Mini at an Apple Special Event at Apple Park in Cupertino, California on October 13, 2020, with the iPhone 12 Pro being released on October 23, 2020, and the iPhone 12 Pro Max on November 13, 2020. They were discontinued on September 14, 2021, along with the iPhone XR, following the announcement of the iPhone 13 and iPhone 13 Pro.

Major upgrades over the iPhone 11 Pro and iPhone 11 Pro Max include the addition of 5G support, the LiDAR sensor, ProRAW (DNG) allowing high quality lossless 12-bit image capture in the native photos app with the use of the new DNG v1.6 specification, the introduction of the MagSafe wireless charging and accessory system, the Apple A14 Bionic system on a chip (SoC), high-dynamic-range video Dolby Vision 10-bit 4:2:0 4K video recording at 30 or 60 fps, larger 6.1-inch and 6.7-inch displays on the iPhone 12 Pro and iPhone 12 Pro Max, respectively, and the move to a base capacity of 128 GB from the prior base capacity of 64 GB, while retaining the other storage capacities of 256 and 512 GB. The iPhone 12 Pro and iPhone 12 Pro Max, like the iPhone 12 and iPhone 12 Mini, are the first iPhone models from Apple to no longer include a power adapter or EarPods headphones found in prior iPhone models; however, a USB-C to Lightning cable is still included, and this change was retroactively applied to other iPhone models sold by Apple including the iPhone XR, iPhone 11 and iPhone SE (2nd generation).

History 

The iPhone 12 Pro and iPhone 12 Pro Max were officially announced alongside the iPhone 12 and iPhone 12 Mini and HomePod Mini via a virtual press event filmed and recorded at Steve Jobs Theater at Apple Park in Cupertino, California, on October 13, 2020. Pre-orders began for the iPhone 12 Pro on October 16, 2020, and it was released on October 23, 2020, alongside the iPhone 12 and fourth-generation iPad Air, with pre-orders for the iPhone 12 Pro Max beginning on November 6, 2020, with a full release on November 13, 2020, alongside the iPhone 12 Mini. This marked the first time since the release of the iPhone XS and iPhone XR where a new iPhone was not released simultaneously on the same date as other announced models. Pricing starts at US$999 for the iPhone 12 Pro and US$1099 for the iPhone 12 Pro Max.

On September 14, 2021, following the announcement of the iPhone 13 Pro and 13 Pro Max, the iPhone 12 Pro and 12 Pro Max were removed from sale on Apple's official website.

In March 2022, Apple started selling refurbished iPhone 12 Pro models starting at $759 but not its Max variant.

Design 
It is the first major redesign since the iPhone X, similar to that of iPad Pros since 2018 and the 4th-generation iPad Air. The iPhone 12 Pro and 12 Pro Max feature a flat chassis, a design seen with the iPhone 4 through the iPhone 5S and the first generation iPhone SE. The notch size is similar to previous models. The bezels are around 35% thinner than the iPhone 11 Pro and previous models. The new design also comes with Corning Inc’s custom ceramic-hardened i.e glass ceramic front glass, "Ceramic Shield", while the back retains the previous generation of Corning Inc's custom Dual-Ion Exchange strengthened glass. On the back is the same three-camera configuration found on the iPhone 11 Pro, but with larger apertures and an added LiDAR scanner.

The iPhone 12 Pro and 12 Pro Max is available in four colors: Silver, Graphite, Gold, and Pacific Blue. Pacific Blue is a new color replacing Midnight Green, while Graphite is a renaming of Space Grey.

Specifications

Hardware 
The iPhone 12 Pro uses Apple's six-core A14 Bionic processor, which contains a 16-core neural engine. It has three internal storage options: 128, 256, and 512 GB. However, the manufacturer warranty does not cover liquid damage to the phone.

The iPhone 12 Pro, like the iPhone 12, is not supplied with EarPods (except in France) or the power adapter included with prior iPhone models. Apple claims this will reduce carbon emissions and that most users already own these items. Apple still supplies the USB-C to Lightning cable that was introduced with the iPhone 11 Pro. In addition to Lightning and Qi wireless charging, the phones introduce MagSafe wireless charging, a new magnet-based charging and accessory system that allow accessories such as chargers and cases to snap onto the back of the phones. MagSafe wireless charging supports up to 15 watts, is fast-charge capable, and is a reimagining of the MagSafe brand that was introduced in 2006 with the original MacBook Pro. The MagSafe Charger can be purchased separately, along with a variety of cases and other accessories.

The iPhone 12 Pro and 12 Pro Max support 5G cellular communications. This allows upload speeds of up to 200 Mbit/s (1 Mbit/s = 1 million bits per second) and download speeds of up to 4 Gbit/s. However, only models sold in the U.S. support the faster mmWave technology; those sold elsewhere in the world, including Canada, only support sub-6 GHz frequency bands. A new feature called Smart Data Mode enables 5G only when necessary to preserve battery life and data usage.

Displays 
The iPhone 12 Pro has a 6.06 inch (154 mm) (marketed as 6.1 inch) OLED display with a resolution of 2532 × 1170 pixels (2.9 megapixels) at 460 ppi, while the iPhone 12 Pro Max has a 6.68 inch (170 mm) (marketed as 6.7 inch) OLED display with a resolution of 2778 × 1284 pixels (3.5 megapixels) at 458 ppi. Both models have the Super Retina XDR OLED display with thinner bezels than previous generation iPhones. The iPhone 12 Pro Max features the largest display on any iPhone to date. The phones also introduce a new glass-ceramic covering, named 'Ceramic Shield', which was co-developed with Corning Inc. Apple claims the Ceramic Shield has "4 times better drop performance" and that it is "tougher than any smartphone glass".

Batteries 
The iPhone 12 Pro is supplied with a 10.78 Wh (2,815 mAh) battery, a slight decrease from the 11.67 Wh (3,046 mAh) battery found in the iPhone 11 Pro, and is identical to the battery found in the standard iPhone 12. The iPhone 12 Pro Max has a 14.13 Wh (3,687 mAh) battery, another slight decrease from the 15.04 Wh (3,969 mAh) battery found in the iPhone 11 Pro Max. The battery is not user-replaceable.

Chipsets 
Both the iPhone 12 Pro and iPhone 12 Pro Max are supplied with the Apple A14 Bionic, the first ARM-based smartphone system-on-a-chip (SoC) manufactured on the 5 nm process node. However, unlike previous years, the iPhone 12 Pro and iPhone 12 Pro Max are not the first Apple devices to receive the newest A-series processor, with the fourth-generation iPad Air being the first device from Apple to contain the A14 Bionic chip. The iPhone 12 Pro and iPhone 12 Pro Max also contain the Apple M14 motion coprocessor. The iPhone 12 Pro and iPhone 12 Pro Max use Qualcomm's X55 5G modem.

Cameras 
The iPhone 12 Pro features four cameras: one front-facing camera and three back-facing cameras, including a telephoto, wide, and ultra-wide camera. The iPhone 12 Pro also features a LiDAR scanner for AR and computer-aided photo enhancement services. The iPhone 12 Pro also adds Night Mode for time-lapse video recording on all four cameras. Unlike the iPhone 11 Pro and iPhone 11 Pro Max where the only difference was the screen size and battery capacity, the iPhone 12 Pro Max adds a 47% larger sensor and sensor-shift image stabilization to the main camera lens, and replaces the f/2.0 aperture 52 mm telephoto camera lens with a f/2.2 aperture 65 mm lens, allowing for a 2.5x optical zoom.

Video Recording of iPhone 12 Pro Max 
iPhone 12 Pro Max HDR video recording with Dolby Vision up to 60 fps. 4K video recording at 24 fps, 25 fps, 30 fps, or 60 fps

 1080p HD video recording at 25 fps, 30 fps, or 60 fps
 720p HD video recording at 30 fps
 Sensor-shift optical image stabilization for video (Wide)
 Optical image stabilization for video (Wide)
 2.5x optical zoom in, 2x optical zoom out; 5x optical zoom range
 Digital zoom up to 7x
 Audio zoom
 Brighter True Tone flash
 QuickTake video
 Slo‑mo video support for 1080p at 120 fps or 240 fps
 Time‑lapse video with stabilization
 Night mode Time‑lapse
 Extended dynamic range for video up to 60 fps
 Cinematic video stabilization (4K, 1080p, and 720p)
 Continuous autofocus video
 Take 8MP still photos while recording 4K video
 Playback zoom
 Video formats recorded: HEVC and H.264
 Stereo recording

The iPhone 12 Pro and iPhone 12 Pro Max are the first smartphones capable of shooting in 10-bit high dynamic range Dolby Vision 4K video at up to 60 frames per second.

Sensors 

The iPhone 12 Pro and iPhone 12 Pro Max include mostly the same sensors found on prior iPhone models going back to the iPhone X. These include an accelerometer, gyroscope, barometer, proximity sensor, ambient light sensor, and a digital compass. The devices also include the Face ID facial recognition system, which is made up of several sensors: mainly a dot projector, flood illuminator, and an infrared camera, allowing a user's face to be scanned and stored by the Secure Enclave.
A LiDAR scanner is the new sensor included in the 12 Pro and 12 Pro Max, similar to that of the fourth-generation iPad Pro, allowing additional augmented reality (AR) features to be supported, such as the ability to measure a user's approximate height from the Measure app.

Software 

The  feature iOS, Apple's mobile operating system. The user interface of iOS is based on the concept of direct manipulation, using multi-touch gestures. Interface control elements consist of sliders, switches, and buttons. Interaction with the OS includes gestures such as swipe, tap, pinch, and reverse pinch, all of which have specific definitions within the context of the iOS operating system and its multi-touch interface. Internal accelerometers are used by some applications to respond to shaking the device (one common result is the undo command) or rotating it vertically (one common result is switching from portrait to landscape mode).

The iPhone 12 Pro was first supplied with iOS 14.1 alongside the iPhone 12 while the iPhone 12 Pro Max was supplied with iOS 14.2 alongside the iPhone 12 Mini. The devices come with the stock iOS apps, such as Safari, Weather, and Messages, and they also include Siri, the personal assistant included in iOS since iOS 5 with the release of the iPhone 4S.

Reception 
The iPhone 12 Pro received generally positive reviews. The Verge called it a "beautiful, powerful, and incredibly capable device", praising the new design reminiscent of the iPhone 5, the speed of the A14 Bionic processor, and its 5G capabilities, but noted the decrease in battery life compared to the iPhone 11 Pro and the low number of upgrades compared to the iPhone 12. Engadget also gave the iPhone 12 Pro a positive review, praising the MagSafe wireless charging and accessory system as well as the improved camera system, but noted the lack of upgrade motivation if users had already purchased a new iPhone in 2019.

Apple was criticized for the continued reliance on Face ID as the sole biometric option to unlock the device, which is incompatible with face masks. This limitation was lifted with the introduction of the fifth revision of the iOS 14, which allows the user to unlock the device while wearing a face mask, using the paired and password unlocked Apple Watch as its alternative authenticator. The iPhone SE (3rd generation) is the only phone that Apple currently produces that supports Touch ID, an alternative option that is compatible with face masks. All models can still use a passcode to log in.

"OLED-gate" 
Within two weeks of its public release, a thread was started at Apple Support Communities describing a problem with pixels on the iPhone 12 and iPhone 12 Pro OLED displays not shutting off completely in black scenes, resulting in what was described as an "ugly glowing"; over 3,500 other users have since clicked the "I have this question too" button in the thread. Other users have shared photos and videos online that demonstrate the issue; one of whom—whose video amassed over 50,000 views—claims Apple responded that they were working on the problem. However, Apple has not officially acknowledged the issue, which persists despite multiple software updates, leading users and pundits to fear a hardware issue.

Removal of the power adapter and EarPods 
Apple, through an "environmental initiative", has removed the EarPods (except in France until 31 January 2022) and power adapter (except in São Paulo) from all new iPhone boxes, including the iPhone 12 and iPhone 12 Pro. According to Apple, removing the power adapter permitted Apple to avoid 180, 000 metric tons of CO2 in fiscal year 2021 thanks to a shift in the mode of transport and product weight. Apple now includes a USB-C to Lightning cable, incompatible with the existing USB-A power adapters that Apple previously supplied with its devices. Users can still use their existing USB-A power adapters and Lightning cables to charge and sync, but must purchase or use an existing USB-C power adapter to utilize the included USB-C to Lightning cable. Starting with the iPhone 8, a USB Power Delivery (USB-PD) compliant charger is required to enable fast charging when using the USB-C to Lightning cable, with Apple suggesting the use of a 20W or greater USB-PD compliant charger to fast charge the iPhone 12.

Environmental data

Carbon footprint 
Of all emissions, 86% and 82% released by producing the iPhone 12 Pro and iPhone 12 Pro Max respectively are caused by device production and primary resource use with the remaining emissions released by means of first use, transportation, and end-of-life processing.

Repairability 
Several weeks after its release, it was discovered by iFixit and Australian tech YouTuber Hugh Jeffreys that a number of key components such as the cameras malfunction or display warnings if they are replaced with new ones or those taken from an otherwise identical donor unit. Internal Apple documents also mention that, beginning with the iPhone 12 and continuing with subsequent models, authorized technicians would have to run the phones through an internal System Configuration tool to reprogram repaired units in order to account for hardware changes. While Apple has yet to comment on the issue, the inability to replace key system components have raised concerns about right to repair and planned obsolescence.

See also 
 Comparison of smartphones
 History of the iPhone
 List of iOS devices
 Timeline of iPhone models

Explanatory notes

References 

 
Discontinued flagship smartphones
IOS
Mobile phones introduced in 2020
Mobile phones with 4K video recording
Mobile phones with multiple rear cameras